Filip Novák may refer to:

 Filip Novák (ice hockey) (born 1982), Czech hockey player
 Filip Novák (footballer) (born 1990), Czech footballer